Panellinios V.C. is the men's volleyball section of Panellinios G.S., the Greek multi-sports club, that is based in Athens. It was one of the first volleyball clubs in Greece, and is also one of the most successful, since it has won six Greek Championships. Panellinios also has a women's team that has won two Greek Women's Championships, and one Greek Women's Cup.

History
Panellinios was one of the first volleyball clubs in Greece. The former sports trainer of Panellinios, Anastasios Lefkaditis, is considered to be the man who is mainly responsible for importing the sport of volleyball to Greece. Panellinios took part in the first unofficial Greek men's volleyball championship, along with Panionios and Ethnikos Athens. It was the first winner of the official Greek volleyball championship in 1936. It won 6 overall Greek championships, through the year 1961. In recent years, the team has played in the A2 Ethniki (2nd-tier level).

Recent seasons

Honours
Greek Championship
Winner (5): 1936, 1937, 1939, 1940, 1961

Women's team
Panellinios also has a volleyball team that dominated in Greek women's volleyball, during the 2000-2002 period. The team won two Greek Women's Championships (2001, 2002), and one Greek Women's Cup (2001). In 2012, the team withdrew from the women's championship, due to financial problems, and nowadays, it plays in the lower local divisions.

Honours
Greek Championship 
Winner (2): 2001, 2002
Greek Cup 
Winner (1): 2001

References

External links
Official website 

Greek volleyball clubs
Panellinios